Gemmill is a surname. Notable people with the surname include:

 Archie Gemmill (born 1947), Scottish international footballer
 James Fairlie Gemmill FRSE (1867-1926) Scottish physician
 Jane Gemmill,  (1855-?), Scottish temperance activist
 John Gemmill, English businessman and the first auctioneer of the Colony of Singapore
 R. Scott Gemmill (fl. 1990s–2020s), American television writer and producer
 Scot Gemmill (born 1971), Scottish international footballer, son of Archie, whose clubs include Nottingham Forest and Everton
 Scott Gemmill (born 1987), Scottish footballer, whose clubs have included Berwick Rangers and Clyde
 Tristan Gemmill (born 1967), English actor
 Willard Gemmill (1875–1935), Justice of the Indiana Supreme Court

See also
 Gemmell, a surname